Gerald Leighton Patterson MC (17 December 1895 – 13 June 1967) was an Australian tennis player.

Patterson was active in the decade following World War I. During his career he won three Grand Slam tournaments in the singles event as well as six titles in the doubles competition and one title in mixed doubles. He was born in Melbourne, educated at Scotch College and Trinity Grammar School and died in Melbourne on 13 June 1967. He was the co-World No. 1 player for 1919 along with Bill Johnston.

Playing career
Tall and well-built, Patterson played a strong serve-and-volley game. At Wimbledon 1919, Patterson beat 41-year-old Norman Brookes, who was defending champion (Brookes' 1914 title was the last held before World War 1) in the Challenge Round. At Wimbledon 1922, the Challenge Round was abolished and Patterson won the title (the first to be held at the current site at Church Road) beating Randolph Lycett in the final. In 1927, Patterson was five championship points down in the Australian singles final against Jack Hawkes, but won in five sets.

Patterson was known as the "Human Catapult" for his powerful serve that many of the top players had trouble returning. He also enjoyed great success representing Australia in Davis Cup and amassed a 32–14 win–loss record (singles 21–10, doubles 11–4) and was part of the winning team in 1919. Patterson played Davis Cup in 1920, 1922, 1924, 1925, 1928 and finally as captain in 1946.  He was a player ahead of his time, playing with a steel racquet strung with wire in 1925.

He was inducted into the Sport Australia Home of Fame in December 1986. This was followed by induction into the International Tennis Hall of Fame in 1989 and the Australian Tennis Hall of Fame in August 1997.

Personal life
Patterson was the nephew of Australian opera singer Dame Nellie Melba and father of racing driver Bill Patterson. In 1917, Patterson was awarded the Military Cross for "conspicuous gallantry and devotion to duty" as an officer in the Royal Field Artillery at Messines.

Grand Slam finals

Singles: 7 (3 titles, 4 runners-up)

Doubles: 14 (6 titles, 8 runners-up)

Mixed doubles: 1 (1 title)

Grand Slam singles performance timeline

Events with a challenge round: (WC) won; (CR) lost the challenge round; (FA) all comers' finalist

(OF) only for French players

1Patterson was the first tennis player to play in three Grand Slam singles tournaments within one calendar year.

References

External links

 
 
 
 
 
  Australian Dictionary of Biography article

1895 births
1967 deaths
Australasian Championships (tennis) champions
Australian Championships (tennis) champions
Australian male tennis players
Tennis players from Melbourne
International Tennis Hall of Fame inductees
United States National champions (tennis)
Wimbledon champions (pre-Open Era)
People educated at Scotch College, Melbourne
People educated at Trinity Grammar School, Kew
Grand Slam (tennis) champions in men's singles
Grand Slam (tennis) champions in mixed doubles
Grand Slam (tennis) champions in men's doubles
Australian recipients of the Military Cross
World number 1 ranked male tennis players
People from Preston, Victoria
Royal Field Artillery officers
Australian military personnel of World War I
Military personnel from Melbourne
Australian people of Scottish descent
Australian people of English descent